Mongo (Arabic: مونقو, Mūnqū) is a city and sub-prefecture in Chad, the capital of the region of Guéra. Located in the northern part of the region, it lies 252.2 miles (406 km) by road east of the capital N'Djamena. It is served by Mongo Airport.

On 11 April 2006, rebels of the United Front for Democratic Change (FUC) took the central city.

Demographics
Mongo city demographics:

By canton
Ethnic composition by canton in 2016 for the sub-prefecture of Mongo:

Migami Canton (population: 47,665; villages: 43):

Dadjo 1 Canton (population: 25,208; villages: 50):

Oyo Canton (population: 11,449; villages: 14):

Schools

Less than half of girls in Mongo go to primary school, and less than 5% of girls in the region make it to secondary school. More boys than girls go to school in Mongo.

References

External links
TravelPost.com Information on Mongo
BBC profile of life in the town

Populated places in Chad
Guéra Region